Aminulrasyid Amzah (c. August 1995 – 26 April 2010) was a 14-year-old Malaysian student from Shah Alam, Selangor who was fleeing from and then fatally shot by Royal Malaysian Police officers.  The incident occurred sometime between 1:10 AM and 2 AM.

Reaction

Media 

The shooting made national headlines, and the subsequent public outcry resulted in the Home Ministry establishing a special panel led by Deputy Home Minister Abu Seman Yusop to investigate.

Political 

Both the federal governing coalition Barisan Nasional (traditionally associated with the police) and their opponents the Selangor governing coalition Pakatan Rakyat (who offered assistance to his family) received allegations of politicization after Aminulrasyid's death. Opposition leader Karpal Singh was later appointed counsel for Aminulrasyid's family. A number of Pakatan Rakyat politicians also asked the Inspector-General of Police to resign as a result of the shooting.

Legal case 

After police corporal Jenain Subi was initially convicted, the legal case reached the Malaysian High Court, where evidence showed the boy was shot at over 20 times. Police Corporal Jenain Subi subsequently had his conviction overturned, an action that was branded "unfair" by members of Aminulrasyid's family. After the verdict, the Inspector-General of Police refused to offer an apology to Aminulrasyid's family, but police corporal Jenain Subi did offer a personal apology to them.

See also 
Kugan Ananthan
Gunasegaran Rajasundram
Ahmad Sarbani Mohamed
Teoh Beng Hock

References

2010 deaths
Deaths by firearm in Malaysia
Deaths by person in Malaysia
Human rights abuses in Malaysia
Year of birth uncertain